Luther Burbank High School (LBHS) is a high school in Sacramento, California, United States. It is a part of the Sacramento City Unified School District.

As of 2002 the school offers a Hmong language class for native speakers of Hmong.

Notable alumni
 Mickey Ibarra, Class of 1969, Assistant to the President & Director of Intergovernmental Affairs,  The White House, 1997 -2001
 Gary Darling, Class of 1975, MLB umpire
 James Donaldson, NBA player
 Terrance Mitchell, NFL player
 Bruce Reyes-Chow, Class of 1987, religious leader
 James Mouton, Class of 1987, MLB player
 Zach Hill, Drummer and member of Death Grips
 Ricky Reynolds NFL Player-New England Patriots-Tampa Bay Buccaneers

See also

 Luther Burbank

References

External links

 Luther Burbank High School

High schools in Sacramento, California